Chainhurst is a wealden village in Kent, England, and is part of Marden civil parish and Maidstone District.

Landmarks

Chainhurst Farmhouse is grade II* listed and parts of it date back to the 16th century.

Economy

Historically, Chainhurst's predominant employment was in agriculture.

Farmland near Chainhurst is used for orchards and arable crops. There were  extensive hop gardens with several former oast houses surviving. The Hopper huts south of the bridge over the River Beult accommodated seasonal workers for the annual hop harvest.

Many residents now commute to work in London or elsewhere.

Cyclo-cross
Since about 2000, Reed Court Farm has been a Cyclo-Cross venue in the sport's London and South East League.

References

External links

Villages in Kent